Francis X. "Chip" Flaherty, Jr.  is an American film producer, publisher and executive at SkyPath Media, a multimedia company producing The Lesson, a lifestyle brand of video programming, where guests share stories of transformative life events.

Business career

Flaherty’s executive producer credits include the upcoming Fatima, starring Harvey Keitel and Sonia Braga; Mother’s Day (2016), starring Julia Roberts and Jennifer Aniston; The Great Gilly Hopkins (2015), starring Octavia Spencer and Kathy Bates; and the animated film The Little Prince (2015), starring Jeff Bridges, Mackenzie Foy, and Rachel McAdams.

In 2000, Flaherty co-founded Walden Media, a film investor, distributor, and publishing company known for producing films based on classic or award-winning children's literature, biographies or historical events. Walden Media’s films include The Chronicles of Narnia, Charlotte’s Web and the Journey to the Center of the Earth. Walden Media has produced more than 30 films that have grossed more than $3.5 billion in worldwide box office,

While at Walden Media, Flaherty also oversaw the company's entrance to the book publishing industry, serving as Publisher.  In 2004, he forged a co-publishing venture with Penguin Young Readers Group and in 2008 he founded the imprint Walden Pond Press as a joint venture with HarperCollins.

In the course of marketing films and books, Flaherty has developed innovative promotional initiatives. A prominent example was Flaherty’s management of the "Break the World Reading Record with Charlotte's Web" event, launched in conjunction with the theatrical release of Charlotte’s Web. On Wednesday, December 13, 2006, 547,826 readers in 2,451 locations, 50 states and 28 countries read an excerpt from Charlotte's Web, breaking the previous world reading record set in the United Kingdom in 2004.

Flaherty also implemented the “Ticket to a Better World” partnership with Read Across America during the theatrical release of The Giver, where 50 cents of every ticket purchased for the film was given to the Read Across America literacy program.

Before working at Walden Media, Flaherty was a Massachusetts assistant district attorney and then an assistant attorney general.

Education
Flaherty graduated Suffolk University Law School and the College of the Holy Cross.

References 

Year of birth missing (living people)
Living people
Suffolk University Law School alumni
College of the Holy Cross alumni
American film producers